"Eventually" is a song by Australian psychedelic music project Tame Impala. It is the fifth track on the 2015 album Currents, and was originally released as a promotional single on 8 May 2015, alongside the announcement of the album. A radio edit was serviced radio in June 2015 as the third single from the album. "Eventually" was certified gold in Australia in 2020.

In April 2015, Parker told Under the Radar the song is about "knowing that you're about to damage someone almost irreparably, and the only consolation you get is this distant hope that they’ll be alright eventually, because you know they aren't going to be now or soon."

The song was shortlisted for Song of the Year at the APRA Music Awards of 2016.

Plagiarism claim
In August 2015, Sam Culley, a member of the '70s funk group Skull Snaps claimed Parker sampled the band's song "It's a New Day" on "Eventually".

Certifications

Release history

References

2015 singles
2015 songs
Modular Recordings singles
Songs written by Kevin Parker (musician)
Tame Impala songs